is a Japanese footballer who plays as a midfielder and currently play for  club, JEF United Chiba.

Youth career
Hidaka played for his high school between 2010 and 2013, before going on to play for Ryutsu Keizai University FC. In 2015 and 2016, Hidaka played 24 times in the Japan Football League for the university affiliate side Ryutsu Keizai Dragons Ryugasaki and scored his first goal for them in a 2–1 win over Sony Sendai FC. In 2016, he also made 10 appearances, scoring 4 goals for Ryutsu Keizai University in the JUFA Kanto League 1.

Club career
In 2017, Hidaka signed for JFL club Honda FC. He made his debut for Honda in a 3–1 win over ReinMeer Aomori in March 2017 and scored his first goal for the club two months later in a 6–1 win over MIO Biwako Shiga. He also made his debut in the Emperor's Cup. Honda went on to be crowned JFL champions, with Hidaka making 22 league appearances, scoring 3 goals. Honda FC went on to win back-to-back league titles, with another league win coming in the 2018 season. Hidaka played 21 games in this season, scoring 2 goals and his performances earned him a place in the JFL Best XI for the season.

In December 2018, it was announced that Hidaka would be transferring to a lower division to play for Iwaki FC in the Tohoku Soccer League. Hidaka scored 6 goals across all competitions in his debut season, helping Iwaki to finish top of their regional division and go on to win promotion to the Japan Football League for the first time in their history following their victory in the Japanese Regional Football Champions League. Playing most of his career to date as a left-back, in the 2020 season Hidaka moved into a more advanced left-sided midfield position. Iwaki finished 7th in their first season in the JFL, but Hidaka managed to make the end of season Best XI for the second time in his career after scoring 4 goals in 15 games.

In only the club's second season participating in the JFL in the 2021 season, Iwaki FC gained promotion to the J3 League. Hidaka made 27 league appearances and was also inducted into the 2021 JFL Best XI for the third time.

In the 2022 season, Hidaka made his J.League debut in a 1–1 draw with Kagoshima United. Another excellent season ensued for him as he helped Iwaki to back-to-back promotions, playing in 32 out of a possible 34 league games and scoring 5 goals. For the second season running, Hidaka was inducted into the league's Best XI.

On 26 November 2022, it was announced that Hidaka would be joining JEF United Chiba for the 2023 season.

Career statistics

Club
.

Honours

Club
 Honda FC
Japan Football League : 2017, 2018

 Iwaki FC
Tohoku Soccer League : 2019
Japanese Regional Football Champions League : 2019
Japan Football League : 2021
J3 League : 2022

Individual
JFL Best XI: 2018, 2020, 2021
J3 League Best XI: 2022

References

External links
Profile at Iwaki FC
Profile at J.League

1995 births
Living people
Japanese footballers
Association football midfielders
Association football people from Hiroshima Prefecture
Ryutsu Keizai University alumni
JEF United Chiba players
Iwaki FC players
Honda FC players
J2 League players
J3 League players
Japan Football League players